Elbridge Gerry Lapham (October 18, 1814January 8, 1890) was a U.S. Senator from New York from 1881–1885.

Life
Lapham attended the public schools and the Canandaigua Academy.  He studied civil engineering and law and was admitted to the bar in 1844 and practiced in Canandaigua, New York.

He was a delegate to the New York State Constitutional Convention of 1867-68.  He was elected as a Republican to the 44th, 45th, 46th and 47th United States Congresses, holding office from March 4, 1875, to July 29, 1881, when he resigned after his election to the U.S. Senate.  He was one of the managers appointed by the House of Representatives in 1876 to conduct the impeachment proceedings against ex-U.S. Secretary of War William W. Belknap.

He was elected as a Republican to the United States Senate on July 22, 1881, to fill the vacancy caused by the resignation of Roscoe Conkling and served to March 4, 1885. He was not a candidate for re-election.  He was Chairman of the U.S. Senate Committee on Fish and Fisheries (48th Congress).

Afterwards he resumed the practice of law in Canandaigua. He died at “Glen Gerry,” on Canandaigua Lake, on January 8, 1890, and was buried at the Woodlawn Cemetery in Canandaigua.

Personal life
Lapham is the son of Judge John Lapham (1793-1860) and his wife, Zimroda Smith Lapham (1793-1879). He is a descendant of John Lapham (1677-1734) and his wife, Mary Russell Lapham (1683-1752). His cousins include Nathan Lapham, Christopher Lloyd and Susan B. Anthony.

On July 2, 1844, in Clifton Springs, New York, he married Jane Frances McBride (1825-1907). They had at least eight children:
 Charlotte Lapham (1845-1910)
 Ellen Frances Lapham (1850-1926)
 Benjamin Franklin Lapham (1852-1907)
 Charles Barnard Lapham (1854-1901)
 Henry Wager Lapham (1857-1938)
 Joanna Louise Lapham (1860-1860)
 John R. Lapham (1862-1888)
 Elbridge Gerry Lapham Jr. (1866-1921)

References

External links

1814 births
1890 deaths
Politicians from Canandaigua, New York
People from Farmington, New York
Republican Party United States senators from New York (state)
Republican Party members of the United States House of Representatives from New York (state)
19th-century American politicians